Italy competed at the 1971 Mediterranean Games in Izmir, Turkey.

By sport

Men

Women

See also
 Boxing at the 1971 Mediterranean Games
 Volleyball at the 1971 Mediterranean Games
 Water polo at the 1971 Mediterranean Games

References

External links
 Mediterranean Games Athletic results at Gbrathletics.com
 1971 - IZMIR (TUR) at CIJM web site

Nations at the 1971 Mediterranean Games
1971
Mediterranean Games